Wu Cherng-dean (born 10 May 1957) is a Taiwanese politician. As of 2003 and 2006 he was of the New Party of the Republic of China in Taiwan and served as a legislator. In 2003 he and Sisy Chen joined the People First Party (PFP) legislative caucus. By 2007 he was a legislator with the Kuomintang. He has been the chairperson of the New Party since 21 February 2020. His cousin is actor-singer Wu Chun.。

Political career

2014 Kinmen magistracy election
On 12 January 2008, he joined the 2008 Republic of China legislative election as a Kuomintang candidate from Kinmen constituency. However, he lost the election.

Kinmen County Deputy Magistrate

2016 Mainland China visit
In September 2016, Wu with another seven magistrates and mayors from Taiwan visited Beijing, which were Hsu Yao-chang (Magistrate of Miaoli County), Chiu Ching-chun (Magistrate of Hsinchu County), Liu Cheng-ying (Magistrate of Lienchiang County), Yeh Hui-ching (Deputy Mayor of New Taipei City), Chen Chin-hu (Deputy Magistrate of Taitung County), Fu Kun-chi (Magistrate of Hualien County) and Lin Ming-chen (Magistrate of Nantou County). Their visit was aimed to reset and restart cross-strait relations after President Tsai Ing-wen took office on 20 May 2016. The eight local leaders reiterated their support of One-China policy under the 1992 consensus. They met with Taiwan Affairs Office Head Zhang Zhijun and Chairperson of the Chinese People's Political Consultative Conference Yu Zhengsheng.

References

External links

 Wu Cherng-dean's blog 

1957 births
Living people
Members of the 5th Legislative Yuan
Members of the 6th Legislative Yuan
Kuomintang Members of the Legislative Yuan in Taiwan
New Party Members of the Legislative Yuan
Kinmen County Members of the Legislative Yuan
Magistrates of Kinmen County
Fu Jen Catholic University alumni
Leaders of the New Party (Taiwan)